Forest Hill station is a Muni Metro station near the Forest Hill and Laguna Honda neighborhoods in San Francisco, California. It was originally built in 1916 to 1918 as part of the Twin Peaks Tunnel, and is the oldest subway station west of Philadelphia and east of Istanbul The station was originally named Laguna Honda; lettering with that former name is carved on the station headhouse.

Scenes from the films Dirty Harry (1971) and Milk (2008) were shot inside of this station.

Station layout and architecture 

Forest Hill Station was built in a "restrained classical revival" style which has remained largely unaltered to the present. There are also a few decorative features suggestive of an Art Nouveau aesthetic, for example malachite colored accents placed over the elevator doors.

The station consists of two side platforms next to the tracks far below the surface. Forest Hill Station is located deeper underground than any other Muni Metro station; so much so that, unlike other stations, most people use an elevator to reach the platform at Forest Hill. Unlike all other underground Muni Metro stations, which feature an underground concourse mezzanine on the first level down, and the platform on the second level down, Forest Hill's concourse level is in a station building on the surface.

Forest Hill and Eureka Valley stations were originally constructed with low platforms, as streetcars of that era had steps to load passengers from street level. However, the six new Market Street Subway stations, as well as West Portal station, were built with high-level platforms for speedier level boarding onto the new Boeing LRVs. With Eureka Valley permanently closed, Forest Hill was left as the only low-platform station on the Muni Metro subway. Muni later modified the station with high-level platforms, elevators for handicapped access, and ventilation improvements. The $6 million project, which upgraded Forest Hill to equal the new stations while keeping its historic architecture, was completed in 1985.

The station was temporarily closed from June 25 to August 24, 2018, during the Twin Peaks Tunnel shutdown.

It was closed again from March 19 to August 22, 2020, and from August 25, 2020, to May 15, 2021, during the COVID-19 pandemic.

See also 
List of San Francisco Designated Landmarks

References

External links 

Muni Metro stations
Railway stations located underground in California
Railway stations in the United States opened in 1918
Underground rapid transit in the United States
San Francisco Designated Landmarks
1918 establishments in California